Fablok Chrzanów is a Polish sports club, founded in 1926 in Chrzanów. Its name reflects the name of club's sponsor - Fablok, the biggest and most important company of the town.

Fablok's most famous soccer player is Paweł Cyganek, who played one game for the Polish National Team (August 27, 1939, Poland - Hungary 4-2). The club, however, also had other sections - ice-hockey, chess, volleyball, basketball, tennis, and handball (which became the strongest one, reaching  Nationwide Polish Handball League). A few years ago, handball section split with Fablok and now exists under the name of MTS Chrzanów.

Presently, after financial problems, Fablok supports only one section - soccer. The team plays in the regional league of the Kraków district. It played in 1939 play-offs for accession to the national league with Śląsk Świętochłowice and Unia Sosnowiec. After World War II the club played in the third division twice, in 1971 and 1997.

Sport in Lesser Poland Voivodeship
Association football clubs established in 1926
Chrzanów
1926 establishments in Poland